Ugas Hassan Ugas Yasin (is the supreme traditional clan elder (Ugaas) of Dishiishe clan.
Ugas Hassan belongs to a dynastical line of succession that continued for centuries. On 15 July 2001 he was crowned, it's said the coronation was conducted at behest of his late father Ugas Yasin. Between 1974-90 he was in the service (army) holding the rank of colonel, in 1987 he went to Italy where he had joined the academy Cievieta Vecchia in Rome.

Coronation 
In 2002 Ugas Hassan was crowned in Andho-bahal valley near, Waaciye district in Bari region, in the attendance of a large folks including high-ranking dignitaries from the Somali region of Ogaden, Somaliland, Kenya, Somalia and Puntland.

Ugas is serving as the nominal chief Ugas for the Harti clans, which itself belongs to Darod family.

Background
In 1983 Hassan graduated from Somali National University with an Economics degree. He fluently speaks Italian and fairly English.

External links
Ugas Hassan lineage

References

African Muslims
Ethnic Somali people
Somali monarchs
Living people
21st-century Somalian people
Somali sultans
Year of birth missing (living people)